Tsoncho Hristov Rodev (June 9, 1926 – 2011) was a Bulgarian historical novelist. He is author of historical and adventure novels, as well as essays and short stories.

Biography
He was born in Provadia on June 9, 1926. His father Hristo Ts. Rodev (1880–1944) was a lawyer, deputy in the XXIII National Assembly, who was killed immediately after September 9, 1944, and subsequently posthumously was sentenced to death by the so-called People's Court. Tsoncho Rodev completed primary education in his hometown and secondary school in Varna, then high education, studying Law at Sofia University.

As the son of a murdered man by the People's Court, he had no right to practice Law and devoted himself to literary activity. He created a number of historical and adventure novels as well as short stories for children and adolescents.

Honorary citizen of Provadia and Sliven (1998). Winner of the Award of the Municipality of Sliven for literature and art "Dobri Chintulov" (1998), the Award for local lore "Dr. Ivan Seliminski" (1995), the Honorary Badge "For Civic Contribution" (2006).

Bibliography
 The Black Horseman (1966, 1978) – an adventure novel
 The Treasure of Lysimachus (1966) – a collection of short stories and short stories
 The Trial (1969) – a historical novel
 They Called Me the Iron Hand (1975, 1975) – a historical novel
 Svetoslav Terter (1971) – a biographical historical novel
 Echoes (1971) – a collection of short stories
 "The Cave of Ghosts" (1972) – a short story
 The Man Without a Shadow (1976)
 The Sword of the Uncompromising (1981) – a historical novel
 The Avengers (1983) – a collection of short stories
 "Beyond the Blue Threshold" (1985) – essay
 Rumble (1980) – a historical novel
 The Storm (1986) – a historical novel
 Two Against Hell (1986) – a historical novel
 The Pirate (With a Black Lion on a Mast) (1994) – a historical novel
 "A bag of keys" (1994) – 12 stories and short stories on real cases about the dignity of the Bulgarian person
 And it was day (1998, 2016 second edition) – a historical novel

References

External links
 Tsoncho Rodev in My Library
 From and for Tsoncho Rodev in the National Catalogue of Academic Libraries in Bulgaria НАБИС
 Tsoncho Rodev at Liternet
 Historical Novels of Tsoncho Rodev

1926 births
People from Sliven
20th-century Bulgarian novelists
Bulgarian historical fiction writers
2011 deaths